Riverton High School may refer to several high schools in the United States:

Riverton High School (Kansas), Riverton, Kansas
Riverton High School (Wyoming), Riverton, Wyoming
Riverton High School (Illinois), Riverton, Illinois
Riverton High School (Utah), Riverton, Utah
Riverton Parke Junior-Senior High School, Montezuma, Indiana